Wishbone Ash are an English hard rock band from Torquay, Devon. Formed in October 1969, the group originally included bassist and lead vocalist Martin Turner, guitarists and vocalists Andy Powell and Ted Turner, and drummer Steve Upton. Their first lineup change came in the spring of 1974, when Ted Turner was replaced by former Home guitarist Laurie Wisefield. Martin Turner had also left by 1980, with John Wetton replacing him for the 1981 album Number the Brave. After Wetton left to form Asia in early 1981, Trevor Bolder joined Wishbone Ash and remained until 1983, when he returned to his previous band Uriah Heep. Bolder was replaced by former Trapeze bassist and vocalist Mervyn Spence. Wisefield was replaced by Jamie Crompton in late 1985, and Andy Pyle replaced Spence in 1986.

In 1987, Martin and Ted Turner returned as part of an original lineup reformation for former manager Miles Copeland's I.R.S. No Speak instrumental album series, to which they contributed Nouveau Calls at the end of the year. Powell was left as the sole remaining constant member of Wishbone Ash by mid-1990, when Upton left the group and retired from the music business. He was replaced briefly by Robbie France and later in the year by Ray Weston, both of whom featured on the 1991 release Strange Affair. Shortly after the album's release, Martin Turner was fired from the group on 1 October 1991, with Pyle returning to take his place. Ted Turner was the final original member of the band to leave in early 1994, with bassist Pyle and drummer Weston following him in leaving the group shortly after.

Powell rebuilt the band with the addition of guitarist Roger Filgate, bassist Tony Kishman and drummer Mike Sturgis. Martin Turner briefly returned for the group's 25th anniversary tour in 1995 and began working on new material, before leaving for a third and final time. After the release and touring of Illuminations, Filgate, Kishman and Sturgis were replaced by Mark Birch, Bob Skeat and Weston, respectively. Birch remained until 2001, when he was replaced by Finnish guitarist Ben Granfelt. After the studio album Bona Fide and live release Almighty Blues: London & Beyond, Granfelt left in 2004 after playing his final show on 30 October. He was replaced by another Finnish guitarist, Jyrki "Muddy" Manninen. Long-term drummer Weston left for a second time in early 2007 due to tiring of touring, with Joe Crabtree taking his place. on 9 May 2017, when Mark Abrahams replaced Manninen as their ninth guitarist. In 2022 Crabtree left the band and was replaced by Mike Truscott.

Members

Current

Former

Timeline

Lineups

References

External links
Wishbone Ash official website

Wishbone Ash